The Coccoideaceae are a family of fungi with an uncertain taxonomic placement in the class Dothideomycetes.

The Family Coccoideaceae includes the following:
Genera:
 Coccodiscus
 Coccodothella
 Coccoidea
 Coccoidella
 Dianesea

References

External links 
 Index Fungorum

Dothideomycetes enigmatic taxa
Dothideomycetes families